This list of the mountains and hills of Thuringia contains a selection of the mountains and hills to be found in the German federal state of Thuringia. They are arranged alphabetically with their height given in metres (m) above sea level (Normalnull).

Highest mountains and hills by region 
The following table lists the highest mountains and hills in each Thuringian region:

All mountains and hills in Thuringia

Alter Stolberg 
→ see below in the section on the Harz

Bleicherode Hills 
→ see below in the section on the Ohm Hills

Drei Gleichen 
 Wassenberg (Wachsenburg Castle) (421 m), Ilm district

Dün 
 unnamed hill (522.3 m), near Keula, near Keulaer Rondell, Kyffhäuser district
 Hockelrain (515.4 m), near Kreuzebra, Eichsfeld district
 Schönberg (498.2 m), near Rehungen, Nordhausen district
 Heiligenberg (493.6 m), near Beuren, Eichsfeld district

Fahner Höhe (Fahnersche Höhe) 
All hills are in the district of Gotha.
 Abtsberg (413 m) 
 Bienstädter Berg (384 m)
 Bienstädter Höhe (345 m)
 Kirchberg (275 m)
 Lerchenberg (199 m)

Finne 
 All hills are in the district of Sömmerda.
 Erbsland (353.6 m), near Ostramondra
 Schockholzberg (347.4 m), near Ostramondra
 Maienberg (336.3 m), near Bachra
 Finnberg (332,4 m), near Burgwenden
 Fuchslöcherberg (329.3 m), near Ostramondra
 Katzenberg (321.4 m), near Ostramondra
 Kreuzberg (319.8 m), near Bachra
 Mühlberg (310.4 m), near Rastenberg

Franconian Forest 
→ For these and other mountains and hills (some outside Thuringia) see the section on Mountains in the article on the Franconian Forest.
 Wetzstein (792,7 m), near Lehesten, Saalfeld-Rudolstadt district
 Kulmberg (726.7 m), near Schlegel, Saale-Orla district
 Klößberg (664 m), near Titschendorf, Saale-Orla district

 Gleichberge 
→ For details see the section on mountains and hills in the article on the Gleichberge.
 All mountains and hills are near Römhild in the district of Nordhausen:
 Großer Gleichberg (679 m) 
 Kleiner Gleichberg (641 m) 
 Kuppe (529 m) 
 Schwanberg (518 m) 
 Schwabhäuser Berg (511 m) 
 Rother Kopf (456 m)
 Alterburg (430 m)
 Hartenburg (404 m)
 Eichelberg (382 m)

Gobert 

 All hills are located in the district of Eichsfeld
 Goburg (543.4 m), near Volkerode, near the border with Hesse
 Rachelsberg (523.4 m), northwest of Wiesenfeld
 Hesselkopf (504.4 m), west-northwest of Wiesenfeld
 Pfaffschwender Kuppe (493.6 m), southwest of Pfaffschwende
 Meinhard (491.3 m), between Neuerode and Kella, border with Hesse
 Uhlenkopf (480 m), west of Volkerode, border with Hesse
 Kahlenberg (460.8 m), northeast of Asbach
 Iberg (426.1 m), east of Asbach

Grabfeld 
→ For these and other mountains and hills (including some outside Thuringia) see the section on mountains and hills in the article on Grabfeld.
 the Gleichberge (max. 679 m): see also the section above on the Gleichberge
 Dietrichsberg (536 m), near Neubrunn
 Großkopf (536 m), near Westenfeld
 Heiliger Berg (530 m), near Henneberg
 Ransberg (514 m), near Bibra

Hainich / Südeichsfeld 
 Rain (516.7 m), Eichsfeld district, near Effelder
 Junkerkuppe (508.9 m), Eichsfeld district, Eichsfeld-Hainich-Werratal Nature Park, Höheberg
 Heldrastein (503 m), Wartburgkreis, Eichsfeld-Hainich-Werratal Nature Park
 Eichstruther Kopf (503 m), Eichsfeld district, Eichsfeld-Hainich-Werratal Nature Park
 Alter Berg (493.9 m), Wartburgkreis, Hainich National Park
 Hohes Rode (493.0 m)
 Craulaer Kreuz (483.2 m)
 Renn (473.2 m)
 Lohberg (468.2 m)
 Winterstein (467.6 m), Unstrut-Hainich district, Eichsfeld-Hainich-Werratal Nature Park
 Otterbühl (465.6 m)
 Sommerstein (461.8 m)
 Alter Busch (454.7 m)
 Pfaffenkopf (454 m), Eichsfeld district, Eichsfeld-Hainich-Werratal Nature Park
 Iberg (453.2 m), Eichsfeld district, Eichsfeld-Hainich-Werratal Nature Park
 Haardt (451.3 m)
 Steiger (448.9 m)
 Lindenhecke (447 m) Wartburgkreis, Eichsfeld-Hainich-Werratal Nature Park
 Totenkopf (444 m), Unstrut-Hainich district, Hainich National Park
 Rittergasserberg (440.3 m)
 Wartenberg (429.9 m)
 Eichenberg (421.5 m), Unstrut-Hainich district, Eichsfeld- Hainich-Werratal Nature Park / Hainich National Park
 Mittelberg (413.3 m)
 Harsberg (409.7 m)
 Pfarrkopf (399.4 m)
 Burgberg (398.0 m)
 Schlossberg (377.0 m)
 Elsberg (360.5 m)

Hainleite 
 Straußberg (463.2 m), between Straußberg and Immenrode, Kyffhäuser district
 unnamed hill (452,3 m), near Großlohra-Friedrichslohra, Nordhausen district
 unnamed hill (445.5 m), eastern foothills of the Straußberg near Großfurra, Kyffhäuser district
 Wolfshof (441.6 m), near Sondershausen, Kyffhäuser district
 Possen (431.5 m), west-northwestern foothills of the Wolfshof
 Löhchen (428.1 m), near Kleinberndten, Kyffhäuser district
 Frauenberg (411.3 m), near Sondershausen, Kyffhäuser district
 Kuhberg (405.8 m), near Seega, aber Gemarkung Oberbösa, Kyffhäuser district
 Heidelberg (403.3 m), near Hachelbich, Kyffhäuser district
 unnamed hill (391.0 m), near Bilzingsleben-Düppel, district Sömmerda
 Pfarrkopf (309.0 m), near Günserode, Kyffhäuser district
 Wächterberg (302,7 m), with the nearby Upper Sachsenburg, near Oldisleben-Sachsenburg, Kyffhäuser district
also:
 Spur on which Lohra Castlestands , near Großlohra, Nordhausen district

Harz 
→ For these and other mountains and hills (including those outside Thuringia) see List of mountains in the Harz.
 All mountains and hills (incl. those of Alter Stolberg and Rüdigsdorf Switzerland) are located in the district of Nordhausen.
 Großer Ehrenberg (635.3 m), near Rothesütte
 Vogelheerd (634.4 m), near Rothesütte
 Großer Steierberg (619.5 m), near Rothesütte
 Kleiner Ehrenberg (610.1 m), near Rothesütte
 Stierberg (602,4 m), near Rothesütte
 Poppenberg (600.8 m), near Ilfeld
 Birkenkopf (599.8 m), near Neustadt Dam
 Spitzer Klinz (585.1 m), near Rothesütte and Sülzhayn
 Dornkopf (579.0 m), near Rothesütte
 Krödberg (577.8 m), near Sülzhayn
 Langenberg (575.8 m) and Langer Berg (515.9 m), near Sülzhayn, on border with Lower Saxony
 Zwergsberg (570.7 m), between Netzkater and Rothesütte
 Bettler (569.0 m), near Neustadt Dam
 Giersberg (567.4 m), between Rothesütte and Netzkater
 Solberg (552,9 m), between Rothesütte and Netzkater
 Honigberg (551.8 m), near Rothesütte
 Kleiner Steierberg (548.9 m), near Rothesütte
 Stehlenberg (548.7 m), near Rothesütte and Sülzhayn
 Butterberg (539.5 m), between Eisfelder Talmühle station and Birkenmoor
 Hagenberg (538.6 m), between Netzkater and Birkenmoor 
 Hohenstein (536.3 m), near Sülzhayn
 Eulenkopf (534.5 m), between Rothesütte and Netzkater
 Mittelberg (533.0 m), near Neustadt Dam
 Großer Hengstrücken (530.8 m), between Rothesütte and Netzkater
 Heidelberg (527.5 m), by Neustadt Dam
 Heiligenberg (524.7 m), near Sülzhayn
 Sandlünz (516.2 m), near Netzkater
 Kleiner Schumannsberg (512,0 m), near Haltepunkt Tiefenbachmühle
 Sattelkopf (510.4 m), between Rothesütte and Netzkater
 Kaulberg (511.7 m), near Ilfeld
 Steierberg (508.9 m), near Sülzhayn
 Kesselberg (507.0 m), near Sülzhayn
 Großer Schumannsberg (497.2 m), near Eisfelder Talmühle station
 Totenkopf (492,6 m), near Appenrode
 Schimmelshütchen (475.9 m), near Sülzhayn
 Sülzberg (464.8 m), near Sülzhayn
 Hegersberg (461.6 m), near Appenrode
 Ochsenkopf (460.3 m), near Netzkater
 Scharfenberg (457.6 m), near Sülzhayn
 Silberkopf (441.4 m), near Ilfeld
 Burgberg der Ruine Ebersburg (ca. 440 m), near Herrmannsacker
 Burgberg der Burgruine Hohnstein (402,9 m), near Neustadt
 Forstköpfe (402,4 m), near Werna
 Großer Mittelberg (400.1 m), near Ellrich
 Müncheberg (392,5 m), near Appenrode
 Zankköpfe (387.1 m), near Werna
 Großer Dörnsenberg (386.4 m), near Ellrich
 Heidberg (386.2 m), near Sülzhayn
 Sackberg (374.4 m), near Sülzhayn
 Schloßkopf (371.1 m), near Neustadt
 Mühlberg (363.8 m), near Appenrode
 Königskopf (357.7 m), near Stempeda, in Alter Stolberg
 Eichenberg (353.6 m), near Herrmannsacker
 Buchholzer Berg (350.1 m), near Buchholz, in Rüdigsdorf Switzerland
 Kleiner Mittelberg (346.2 m), near Ellrich
 Kohnstein (334.9 m), near Nordhausen
 Reesberg (325.2 m), near Urbach, in Alter Stolberg
 Weidenberg (322,9 m), near Rüdigsdorf, in Rüdigsdorf Switzerland
 Sandkopf (317.6 m), near Appenrode
 Petersdorfer Berg (Harzrigi; 316.6 m), near Petersdorf, in Rüdigsdorf Switzerland
 Eichenberg (303.7 m), near Petersdorf, in Rüdigsdorf Switzerland
 Kuhberg (302,7 m), near Rüdigsdorf, in Rüdigsdorf Switzerland
 Pfennigsberg (300.3 m), near Petersdorf, in  Rüdigsdorf Switzerland
 Bornberg (295.5 m), near Rüdigsdorf, in Rüdigsdorf Switzerland
 Lichte Höhe (295.5 m), near Rüdigsdorf, in Rüdigsdorf Switzerland
 Zinkenberg (290.5 m), between Leimbach and Steigerthal, in Alter Stolberg
 Stöckey (277.8 m), near Krimderode, in the Rüdigsdorf Switzerland
 Glockenstein (273.2 m), near Niedersachswerfen, in Rüdigsdorf Switzerland
 Danielskopf (272.6 m), near Krimderode, in Rüdigsdorf Switzerland
 Sichelberg (263.0 m), near Krimderode/Ellersiedlung, in Rüdigsdorf Switzerland
 Brommelsberg (256.3 m), near Nordhausen, in Rüdigsdorf Switzerland
 Kirchberg (252,9 m), near Niedersachswerfen, in Rüdigsdorf Switzerland
 Kuhberg (245.4 m), near Krimderode, in Rüdigsdorf Switzerland
in addition there is the following of unknown height:
 Burgberg der Heinrichsburg, near Neustadt

Thuringian Highland and Thuringian Forest 
‣ Main summits are in boldface. Side-peaks are indented under the appropriate main peak.

‣ Abbreviations: 

 Grosser Beerberg (982.9 m) (R/S), Ilm district, TF 
 Wildekopf (943 m), Schmalkalden-Meiningen district, TF
 Sommerbachskopf (941 m) (L), Schmalkalden-Meiningen district, TF
 Unterer Beerberg (891 m) (L), Suhl, TF
 Farmenfleck (890 m) (L), Schmalkalden-Meiningen district, TF
 Schneekopf (978 m) (L/R), Ilm district, TF 
 Teufelskreise (967 m) (L), Ilm district, TF
 Fichtenkopf (944 m) (L), Suhl, TF 
 Sachsenstein (915 m) (L), Ilm district, TF 
 Brand (885 m) (L), Gehlberg, Ilm district, TF
 Goldlauterberg (874 m) (L), Suhl, TF
 Grosser Finsterberg (944 m) (A/R), Ilm district, TF
 Finsterberger Koepfchen ("Kleiner Finsterberg"; 875 m) (L), Ilm district, TF
 Grosser Inselsberg (916.5 m) (L/N/R/S), Schmalkalden-Meiningen, TF
 Großer Hermannsberg (867 m) (A/S), Schmalkalden-Meiningen, TF
 Hettstädt (808.1 m), TH
 Mittelberg (803.6 m), Lichte, TH, R
 Seimberg (803 m), Brotterode, TF 
 Rauhhügel (801.9 m), Schmiedefeld (Lichtetal), TS
 Spitzer Berg (790.3 m), Lichte TH
 Meuselbacher Kuppe (786 m) (L), Meuselbach-Schwarzmühle, TH
 Apelsberg (780 m), Lichte, TH, R
 Mutzenberg (770 m), Lichte, TH
 Rückertsbiel (756 m), Lichte, TH
 Sauhügel (722 m), Lichte, TH
 Rehhecke (Thuringian Highland) (707 m), Lichte, TH
 Assberg (Thuringian Highland) (703 m), Lichte, TH
 Hopfenberg (536.1 m), Waltershausen, TF
 Hahnberg (686 m), Lichte, TH
 Milmesberg (461.2 m), Wartburgkreis district, (L) TF 
 Ziegenberg (Thuringian Highland) (460 m), Saalfeld-Rudolstadt district, TH
 Queste (Berg) (425 m), Schmalkalden, TF
 Stechberg (342 m), Wartburgkreis district, TF

See also 
 Mountain
 List of the highest mountains in Germany
 List of mountain and hill ranges in Germany

Thuringia
Mount